I Was a Satellite of the Sun - is a Soviet feature dramatic science-fiction film of 1959 with animation elements.

Story 

The story is told as an autobiography of the astronaut character Andrew, and set in the future, where space flight is common.

Scientist/Astronaut Petrovich pioneers the way to the Sun, but his spacecraft is never heard from again.  Later, Andrew's laboratory investigates means of protection from deadly radiation. Andrew repeats Petrovich's journey, and risks his life to rescue an orbiting science laboratory, which holds the solution to the problem.

Altered matter near the Sun is responsible for deadly radiation.

Animated scenes explain orbital dynamics, auroras, solar radiation, and other scientific topics.

The first panel reads:

Cast 

 P. Makhotin - Andrew, a young scientist
 V. Ymelyanov - Igor Petrovich, Andrew's father
 G. Shamshurin - Sergei Ivanovich
 A. Shamshurin - Andrew as young child

In episodes

 N. Vishnevskaya
 G. Vitsin
 K. Erofeev
 P. Samarin

Uncredited

 Felix Jaworski - astronaut
 Mikhail Mayorov

Crew 

 Writers: V. Kapitanovsky, V. Shreyberg
 Producer: V. Morgenstern
 Operators: O. Samutsevich, G. Lyakhovich
 Music: A Sevastiyanov
 Artist: L. Chibisov
 Editor: G. Fradkin
 Director: Yu. Merkulov
 Art Director: L. Model'
 Oprator: M. Lruya
 Recording: B. Pekker
 Conductor: V. Smirnov
 Production manager: B. Rodin
 Animation: Soyuzmultfilm studios
 Animation
 V. Al'tshullev
 L. Akimov
 M. Galkin
 A. Klopotoviskij
 V. Nikitchenko
 A. Sokolov
 V. Sholina
 Yu. Xolin

Scientific consultants 

 A. M. Kasatkin
 V. N. Komarov

Related facts 

 The parts of the film correspond to a 300m maximum length for 35mm film rolls standardized in the Soviet Union; the seven parts of this film amount to 1816.7 m.

References

External links 
  (Russian)
 
 Я был спутником Солнца  article at "Советская кинофантастика"

1959 films
1950s science fiction films
Films set in the future
Films with live action and animation
Soviet science fiction films
Space adventure films